Darthanon Queen is a 1980 fantasy role-playing game adventure published by Judges Guild for Traveller.

Plot summary
Darthanon Queen is set of three scenarios, each taking place aboard the disabled Type M subsidized merchant, The Darthanon Queen, with the objective of the player characters to salvage the ship and rescue the passengers.

Publication history
Darthanon Queen was written by Ray Harms, Michael Reagan, and Dan Hauffe and was published in 1980 by Judges Guild as a 32-page book with removable deck plans and a map.

Reception
William A. Barton reviewed Darthanon Queen in The Space Gamer No. 34. Barton commented that "All in all, the high standards of Judges Guild shine through in this adventure. It can only be hoped that JG will continue to contribute to the growing family of Traveller products."

References

Judges Guild publications
Role-playing game supplements introduced in 1980
Traveller (role-playing game) adventures